Hur Moghan or Hoor Moghan, also rendered as Huri Moghan or Hur Moqan may refer to:
 Hur Moghan-e Olya
 Hur Moghan-e Sofla